The IEEE Joseph F. Keithley Award in Instrumentation and Measurement is a Technical Field Award of the Institute of Electrical and Electronics Engineers (IEEE) that was established by the IEEE Board of Directors in 2001 and first awarded in 2004. It is named in honor of Joseph F. Keithley, the founder of Keithley Instruments, and it replaced the previous IEEE Morris E. Leeds Award, which was named in honor of Morris E. Leeds, an inventor of electrical measuring devices and controls. The award is presented annually for outstanding contributions in electrical measurements, and is sponsored by Keithley Instruments and the IEEE Instrumentation and Measurement Society.

The award is not to be confused with the similarly-named Joseph F. Keithley Award For Advances in Measurement Science of the American Physical Society, which was also endowed by Keithley Instruments.

Recipients
The award has been given to the following people.

 2021: Eric W. Strid and Reed K. Gleason
 2020: Dario Petri
 2019: Alan Finkel
 2018: David W. Allan
 2017: Jerome Blair
 2016: Samuel P. Benz
 2015: Jean-Charles Bolomey
 2014:  Thomas E. Linnenbrink
 2013: Dylan Forrest Williams
 2012: Rik Pintelon
 2011: Reza Zoughi
 (Not awarded in 2010)
 2009: Bryan P. Kibble 
 2008: Robert G. Fulks
 2007: Douglas Kent Rytting
 2006: Alessandro M. Ferrero
 2005: Clark A. Hamilton
 2004: Henry Parsons Hall

References 

IEEE technical field awards
Awards established in 2004
Measurement